Brian Cecil Vernon Oddie (16 May 1905 – 7 August 1996) was a British long-distance runner. He competed in the men's 5000 metres at the 1928 Summer Olympics. He also competed in the 3 mile race at the 1930 British Empire Games for England.

Oddie was also a civil servant at the time of the 1930 Games and lived in Luton.

References

External links

1905 births
1996 deaths
Athletes (track and field) at the 1928 Summer Olympics
British male long-distance runners
Olympic athletes of Great Britain
Place of birth missing
Athletes (track and field) at the 1930 British Empire Games
Commonwealth Games competitors for England